{{DISPLAYTITLE:C22H23O12}}
The molecular formula C22H23O12, molar mass: 479.41 g/mol (aglycone), 514.86 g/mol (chloride), exact mass : 479.1189512 u (C22H23O12+ (aglycone), C22H23O12Cl (chloride)) may refer to:
 Petunidin-3-O-glucoside
 Pulchellidin 3-glucoside